Karaoke on the Maidan (Ukrainian: Караоке на Майдані,  Karaoke on the Square) was a Ukrainian music programme and television talent show created by Ihor Kondratiuk and Andrey Kozlov. During its runtime between 1999 and 2019, Karaoke on the Maidan was a popular television programme in Ukraine, scoring well in the ratings. Its former list of finalists and winners include Tina Karol, Max Barskih, Vitaliy Kozlovskiy, Natalia Valevska, Oleksandr Skichko and Taras Topolya.

After shooting for over twenty years and producing more than a thousand episodes, creator and presenter Ihor Kondratiuk pulled the plug of the show in late 2018. The source of the cancellation was an ending contract with then broadcaster STB. Meanwhile Kontratiuk felt that the programme had outlived itself and had become old-fashioned.

History
The idea for Karaoke on the Maidan was developed by Ihor Kondratiuk and Andrey Kozlov, who were both participants of the Russian television game What? Where? When?. The idea was initially developed for the Moscow regional television station 31st channel. There, it aired as Karaoke on the Arbat.

In 1999, the idea was brought to Ukraine where it was branded as Karaoke on the Maidan, being primarily shot on the Maidan Nezalezhnosti, just past the Kyiv Passage. The song's theme initially was Mikhail Shufutinsky's song "Khreshchatyk", a reference to the Khreshchatyk, on which the programme was shot. Although the first broadcasts just totally for about 20 minutes, the programme was later stretched to an hour.

Between 2001 and 2002, television station Ukraine aired the programme Karaoke near the Fountain, which was analogue to the Karaoke on the Maidan format shot in Donetsk. In 2002, Kondratiuk, Kozlov and their production company Prime Time started a lawsuit against the television station clamming copyright infringement. The initial lawsuit was lost by Kondratiuk and his production company, but after an appeal, the court agreed that copyright had been violated.

TV channel 1+1 bought the right to broadcast it on air in 2007. In 2008, ABC earned the right to produce and broadcast the programme until the show's cancellation in November 21, 2008. In 2009, STB earned the right to produce and broadcast the programme until the show's cancellation in early 2019.

Format
During its twenty years on air, the format Karaoke on the Maidan stayed almost identical.

 a crowd of people is gathered on the street and everyone is a potential participant of the game;
 the presenter, Ihor Kondratiuk, starts to sing a song together with the crowd;
 Kondratiuk chooses at his discretion those people who were singing that song better than others for the further game;
 the contestants are allowed to sing a song of their choice;
 among the contestants, the crowd has to elect the ones who will take part in the final episode of the program;
 the finalists are gathering money in the crowd to find out who is the winner;
 the one who has gathered more money is the winner of the episode.

Spin-offs

Chance (2003–2008) 
Alongside Karaoke on the Maidan, Ihor Kondratiuk created the spin-off Chance with  Andriy Kuzmenko and Natalia Mohylevska as presenters, starting in 2003 and ending in 2008. The participants of Chance were young singers and music enthusiasts who had to prepare a TV performance within the space of one day. They were helped to prepare their performance with professional hair dressers, make-up artists and producers. The programme ran until 2008, when its function was replaced by new television formats on Ukrainian television. Around 90% of the participants on Chance had previously appeared on Karaoke on the Maidan.

American Chance (2008)
In 2007, Kondratiuk co-created another, one-season spin-off of Karaoke on the Maidan, which he named American Chance. The programme was co-created with David Junk, who had previously achieved success in the United States with the Russian groups t.A.T.u. and Smash!!. Junk and Kondratiuk searched young female singers to become all-Ukrainian girl band with an English repertoire. Twelve girls were chosen to participate in the programme, which was also partially shot as a reality show. Eventually, five girls, including artists Nadya Dorofeeva, Yana Solomko and MamaRika were grouped as Glam. However, the project was halted in early 2008 as a result of the global financial crisis and a low amount of interest in the project from the American music industry as a likely result of it. Glam released one promotional song, "Thirsty", which was never released commercially.  Despite that, the show was still broadcast in 2008.

References

External links
 "Natalia Subota 'Karaoke on the Maidan'... and in the Court"

1990s music television series
2019 Ukrainian television series endings
2000s music television series
2010s music television series